The Circular light rail is a light rail line in Kaohsiung, Taiwan, operated by Kaohsiung Rapid Transit Corporation. The southern part of this line makes use of the defunct tracks of the Kaohsiung Harbor Railway Line. Construction cost was forecasted to be 16.5 billion New Taiwan dollars.

Construction of Phase I began on 4 June 2013. Stations C1 to C14 were open on a test-basis (free for the public) from August 2015, and commenced formal operations in September 2017. From November 2014 onwards, the CAF Urbos trams used in these tracks were tested in this line parked on multiple occasions.

Phase II construction of the northern section partially began on 12 January 2021 after the underground relocation of the Kaohsiung urban railway. The northern part of Phase II was scheduled to be opened in June 2021 along with the rest, but was delayed due to local opposition and is now projected to complete by 2023.

History

Stations

Rolling stock

The line's fleet consists of nine CAF Urbos trams that will operate catenary-free.

15 Alstom Citadis 305 trains will be introduced. The first Alstom trams entered service in November 2020.

Ticket
Unlike the Kaohsiung Metro Red and Orange Lines, the Kaohsiung Light Rail is charged at a lower rate. As of January 2019, the fare for each light rail is NT$30. There is special offer by using the digital wallet (such as iPass, EasyCard, icash, etc.) is NT$10. Card readers are available at each station and inside of tramway. When paying the fare by the e-ticket (digital wallet), passengers are only charged one of them at each time. When paying by cash, passengers can purchase tickets at the ticket vending machines at each station for the ticket inspector to check.

Previous light rail demonstration project

In 2004, the Kaohsiung City Government and Siemens built a temporary two-station circular light rail line in Central Park, operated by a single trainset, to demonstrate the feasibility of building a light rail system in Kaohsiung City. It was meant to alleviate some residents' concerns that light rail would negatively impact their surroundings by producing excessive noise and hindering normal traffic flow. This Siemens Combino vehicle would later become the D2 Class operated in Melbourne, Australia.

See also
 Danhai light rail
 Transportation in Taiwan
 Kaohsiung Metro

References

External links

 Kaohsiung LRT Network Map
 Kaohsiung LRT Project(Phase I) Project Brief
 LRT Pages in Kaohsiung Metro Construction Bureau
 The newest Kaohsiung LRT proposal clip
 Older Kaohsiung LRT proposal clip

Standard gauge railways in Taiwan
Light rail transit in Kaohsiung
Railway lines opened in 2016
2016 establishments in Taiwan
Light rail in Taiwan